Markarian 177 is a blue compact dwarf galaxy located  away, at the constellation of Ursa Major, in the bowl of the Big Dipper asterism.  It was discovered by the astronomer Benjamin Markarian.

Markarian 177 is a peculiar galaxy that is receding from us at a rate of 2425 km/s. It has a visual apparent size of 0.41×0.34 arcmin.

SDSS1133
It may be an ejected supermassive black hole from a galaxy that interacted with Markarian 177.

Alternative explanations for the X-ray source include it possibly being a luminous blue variable star that has recently undergone a supernova in the early 2000s, where for the previous five decades it had been in continuous eruption.

Further reading

References

External links
 —VIDEO

Ursa Major (constellation)

Dwarf galaxies

177
UGCA objects